Peggy Morgan (born December 16, 1981) is an American former mixed martial artist who competed in the Featherweight division. She has fought in UFC and Invicta FC.

Mixed martial arts career

Ultimate Fighting Championship
In August 2013, Peggy Morgan was announced as a cast member of The Ultimate Fighter: Team Rousey vs. Team Tate. She defeated Bethany Marshall via TKO during the entry round and was the second female pick of Team Rousey. She went on to lose to Sarah Moras via submission in the first round to get to the semi finals.

Morgan made her promotional debut against TUF 18 teammate Jessamyn Duke on November 30, 2013 at The Ultimate Fighter 18 Finale. She lost via unanimous decision (30–27, 30–27, 30–27). Morgan lost the fight via unanimous decision and was subsequently released from the promotion.

Invicta
Morgan signed with Invicta FC in mid-2014, and made her debut against Irene Aldana at Invicta FC 8: Waterson vs. Tamada on September 9, 2014, losing by submission with a rear-naked choke in the first round.

In her second fight for the promotion, Morgan faced Andria Wawro on December 5, 2014, at Invicta FC 10. She won the fight by unanimous decision. Megan Anderson dominated Morgan at Invicta FC 18: Grasso vs. Esquibel.

On January 12, 2017, Peggy officially announced her retirement from MMA, saying that she had decided after her last fight that she was ready to be done.

Mixed martial arts record

|-
|Loss
|align="center" |4–4
|Megan Anderson
|TKO (punches)
|Invicta FC 18: Grasso vs. Esquibel
|
|align="center" | 1
|align="center" | 4:09
|Kansas City, Missouri, United States
|
|-
|Win
|align="center" |4–3
|Jessy Miele
|Decision (unanimous)
|CES 30: Lane vs Felix II
|
|align="center" | 3
|align="center" | 5:00
|Lincoln, Rhode Island, United States
|
|-
|Loss
|align="center" |3–3
|Latoya Walker
|Decision (unanimous)
|Invicta FC 12: Kankaanpää vs. Souza
|
|align="center" | 3
|align="center" | 5:00
|Kansas City, Missouri, United States
|
|-
|Win
|align="center" |3–2
|Andria Wawro
|Decision (unanimous)
|Invicta FC 10: Waterson vs. Tiburcio
|
|align="center" | 3
|align="center" | 5:00
|Houston, Texas, United States
|
|-
|Loss
|align="center" |2–2
|Irene Aldana
|Submission (rear-naked choke)
|Invicta FC 8: Waterson vs. Tamada
|
|align="center" | 1
|align="center" | 2:50
|Kansas City, Missouri, United States
|
|-
|Loss
|align="center" |2–1
|Jessamyn Duke
|Decision (unanimous)
|The Ultimate Fighter 18 Finale
|
|align="center" | 3
|align="center" | 5:00
|Las Vegas, Nevada, United States
|
|-
|Win
|align="center" |2–0
|Revelina Berto
|Decision (unanimous)
|CFA 10: McSweeney vs. Staring
|
|align="center" | 3
|align="center" | 5:00
|Coral Gables, Florida, United States
|
|-
|Win
|align="center" |1–0
|Kaline Medeiros
|Decision (majority)
|Reality Fighting: Mohegan Sun
|
|align="center" | 3
|align="center" | 5:00
|Uncasville, Connecticut, United States
|
|-

Mixed martial arts exhibition record

|-
|Loss
|align="center" |1–1
|Sarah Moras
|Submission (armbar)
|The Ultimate Fighter Season 18
|
|align="center" | 1
|align="center" | 4:39
|Las Vegas, Nevada, United States
|
|-
|Win
|align="center" |1–0
| Bethany Marshall
|TKO (punches)
|The Ultimate Fighter Season 18
|
|align="center" | 1
|align="center" | 2:58
|Las Vegas, Nevada, United States
|
|-

References

External links
 
 

1979 births
Living people
Mixed martial artists from Mississippi
Sportspeople from Biloxi, Mississippi
American female mixed martial artists
Southern New Hampshire University alumni
Bantamweight mixed martial artists
Featherweight mixed martial artists
Mixed martial artists utilizing boxing
Mixed martial artists utilizing kickboxing
Mixed martial artists utilizing wrestling
Mixed martial artists utilizing Brazilian jiu-jitsu
American practitioners of Brazilian jiu-jitsu
Female Brazilian jiu-jitsu practitioners
21st-century American women